A bellboy is  a hotel porter.

Bellboy or Bell boy may also refer to:

 Bell Boy 13, a 1923 film starring Douglas MacLean
 The Bellboy, a 1960 Jerry Lewis film
 The Bell Boy a 1918 short film
 "Bell Boy" (song) by The Who
 Bell Boy (boat), a line of fiberglass boats produced in the 1950s and 1960s
 Bellboy pager

See also 
 Bellhop (disambiguation)
 Bellman (disambiguation)